The Ministry of Cabinet Affairs is a ministry of the Government of South Sudan. The incumbent minister is Martin Elia Lomuro.

References

Cabinet Affairs
South Sudan, Cabinet Affairs